Heinrich Eugen Waentig (21 March 1870 – 22 December 1943) was a German economist and politician.

Waentig was born in Zwickau, Saxony. From 1888 to 1893, he studied at University of Munich, University of Berlin, University of Leipzig, and University of Vienna, eventually earning his doctoral degree at the University of Leipzig. Subsequently, he traveled to the United States and East Asia.

He finished his habilitation in 1895 at University of Marburg in 1895 to become a Privatdozent there. In the following year, he was appointed professor extraordinarius, 1899 zum professor ordinarius of the University of Greifswald. 1902 he switched to the University of Münster, 1904 to University of Halle.

Waentig was hired by the government of the Empire of Japan as a foreign advisor, and taught political economics and financial science from 1909-1913 at the Tokyo Imperial University. One of the reasons he was hired was that although he was German, he could lecture fluently in the English language.

In 1913, Waentig was recalled by the Prussian Education Minister and returned (until 1933) to his Chair of Halle University. In 1920, he was elected member of the Prussian Landtag under the Social Democratic Party of Germany (SPD); in 1927, he was appointed Oberpräsident of the Province of Saxony; in March 1930, Prussian Minister of the Interior. After an argument with the SPD in 1931 he resigned his party membership.

Waentig died in Baden-Baden, Germany, in 1943.

Works 
 Gewerbliche Mittelstandspolitik. Eine rechtshistorisch-wirtschaftspolitische Studie auf Grund österreichischer Quellen Leipzig: Duncker & Humblot 1898.
 Die japanische Revolution 1867 (The Japanese revolution of 1867). Bonn/Leipzig: K. Schroeder 1920.
 Herausgabe: Sammlung sozialwissenschaftlicher Meister. Jena: Gustav Fischer; Aalen: Scientia Verlag 1903-10.

External links
 

1870 births
1943 deaths
People from the Kingdom of Saxony
German expatriates in Japan
Foreign advisors to the government in Meiji-period Japan
Foreign educators in Japan
German economists
Prussian politicians
Academic staff of the University of Greifswald
Academic staff of the University of Tokyo
Academic staff of the University of Münster
Interior ministers of Prussia
Provincial Presidents of Saxony